Momir Mileta (born 14 August 1971) is a Serbian former professional footballer who played as a midfielder.

References

1971 births
Living people
Serbian footballers
Association football midfielders
AEL Limassol players
OFK Beograd players
FK Rudar Pljevlja players
FK Čukarički players
Íþróttabandalag Vestmannaeyja players
FK Radnički Obrenovac players
Grindavík men's football players
Serbian expatriate footballers
Serbian expatriate sportspeople in Cyprus
Expatriate footballers in Cyprus
Serbian expatriate sportspeople in Iceland
Expatriate footballers in Iceland